Calliostoma is a genus of small to medium-sized sea snails with gills and an operculum, marine gastropod molluscs within the family Calliostomatidae, the Calliostoma top snails. Previously this genus was placed within the family Trochidae. Calliostoma is the type genus of the family Calliostomatidae.

Taxonomy 
The name of this genus is derived from the Greek words kallos (beautiful) and stoma (mouth), referring to the pearly aperture of the shell. The genus Calliostoma is known in fossil records from the Upper Cretaceous onwards.

As of 2022, Calliostoma is treated as a very broad genus of about 300 accepted species. While current information is too fragmentary to assign all species in a revised genus, it is expected to be broken up and (some) subgenera will be elevated to the status of genus. A complete listing can be found at the list of Calliostoma species.

Description
The rather thin, acute, coeloconoid (=approaching conical shape but with concave sides) shell is imperforate or rarely umbilicate. The whorls are smooth, often polished and spirally ridged or granular. The body whorl is angulated at the periphery. The aperture is quadrangular, sinuated at the base and slightly oblique. The columella is simple, usually ending anteriorly in a slight tooth. The nucleus appears to be either dextral or sinistral indifferently.

Distribution and habitat 
The distribution of this genus is worldwide, found mainly on hard substrates, although Japanese species have been found on sandy bottoms. These snails occur from shallow waters to bathyal depths.

Behaviour and ecology 
The species in this genus are mainly herbivorous or feed on detritus, although a few have been observed to be omnivorous (Keen, 1975) or even carnivorous, feeding on a wide range of algae and on animals belonging to various other invertebrate phyla. The North Atlantic topshell Calliostoma occidentale has been reported to feed on coelenterates.

Contrary to what is the case in most other top shells, species of the genus Calliostoma deposits their eggs in gelatinous ribbons that are only fertilized after being deposited. The young emerge as small snails (Lebour, 1936) without passing through a free-living planktonic stage as a veliger larva.

Gallery

References

 Vilvens C. (2012) New species and new records of Seguenzioidea and Trochoidea (Gastropoda) from French Polynesia. Novapex 13(1): 1–23. [10 March 2012] page(s): 18

Further reading

 

 
 Vilvens C. (2009). New species and new records of Calliostomatidae (Gastropoda: Trochoidea) from New Caledonia and Solomon Islands. Novapex 10(4): 125-163

 
Gastropod genera
Taxa named by William John Swainson